Billy Howard Sr. (July 17, 1950 – February 13, 2005) was an American football defensive lineman who played three seasons with the Detroit Lions of the National Football League (NFL). He was drafted by the Lions in the second round of the 1974 NFL Draft. He played college football at Alcorn State University and attended Coahoma Agricultural High School in Clarksdale, Mississippi. Howard was also a member of the Winnipeg Blue Bombers of the Canadian Football League.

Howard died February 13, 2005, in Grand Prairie, Texas, at the age of 54.

References

External links
Just Sports Stats

1950 births
2005 deaths
Players of American football from Mississippi
American football defensive ends
Canadian football defensive linemen
African-American players of American football
African-American players of Canadian football
Alcorn State Braves football players
Detroit Lions players
Winnipeg Blue Bombers players
Hamilton Tiger-Cats players
Sportspeople from Clarksdale, Mississippi
20th-century African-American sportspeople
21st-century African-American people